Do Dil... Ek Jaan ( Two Hearts... One Soul) is an Indian television drama series, that premiered on Life OK on3 June 2013 and ended on 24 January 2014. It was produced by Abhinav Shukla under his Nautanki Films banner. The series starred Ayaz Ahmed, Nikita Sharma, Kanwar Dhillon and Shritama Mukherjee.

Plot
A Kashmiri girl named Antara moves with her mother to Mumbai, where she falls in love with a gangster, Raghu. Raghu is forced to make hard decisions about whether his allegiances lie with his gang and his godmother, Daya Mayi, or with his newfound love, Antara.

Raghu's past catches up with him when Daya Mayi's son, Satya, returns home. Satya ruins Raghu and Antara's marriage plans. When Raghu discovers that Antara is pregnant with his child, Raghu and Antara escape. Antara gives birth to a boy, Vidhan, but eventually Satya finds and kills Antara and Raghu. Satya later marries and has a daughter, Vedika.

20 years later 
Vedika returns to the district where she falls in love with Vidhan, Raghu's son. Tragedy follows and Satya's sins come back upon him many times over, completing the cycle of violence that he began when he murdered Raghu and Antara. Vidhaan returns to seek revenge on Satya and meets Machmach who is unaware that Vidhaan is Raghu's son. When Vidhaan reveals his identity to Machmach, he vows to help him in his revenge.

Vidhaan faces Satya and a fight ensues. Vidhaan chooses to spare Saya's life who uses this as an advantage and shoots an unsuspecting Vidhaan. As Vedika witnesses Vidhaan dying, she shocks her father and kills herself by shooting herself in the chest.

A heartbroken Satya repents all the murders he committed as Machmach taunts him about his fate.

Cast

Main
 Ayaz Ahmed as Raghu Nayak: Daya Mayi's foster son; Antara's lover; Vidhan’s father (Dead)
 Nikita Sharma as Antara Kaul: Ashok and Geeta's daughter; Raghu's lover; Vidhan’s mother (Dead)
 Akshay Dogra as Satya: Daya Mayi's son; Manjari's husband; Vedika's father 
 Kanwar Dhillon as Vidhaan Raghu Nayak: Raghu and Antara's son; Vedika's lover
 Shritama Mukherjee as Vedika: Satya and Manjari's daughter; Vidhaan's lover

Recurring
 Farooq Sheikh as Ashok Kaul, Geeta's husband; Antara's father (Dead)
 Kishori Shahane as Geeta Kaul: Ashok's wife; Antara's mother 
 Kamya Panjabi / Shilpa Shinde / Pragati Mehra as Daya Mayi: Satya's mother; Raghu's godmother; Vedika's grandmother
 Kanishka Soni as Manjari: Satya's wife; Vedika's mother
 Shubham as Ishaan Kaul: Ashok and Geeta's son; Antara's brother
 Jaskaran Gandhi as Machinder "Machmach"
 Latesh Sharma as Battery
 Vineet Kuma as Aman / Tareeq
 Jayshree T. as Aaji 
 Vinny Arora as Rukhsana
 Sumit Kaul as Govind
 Resham Tipnis as Saroj
 Pawan Tiwari as Arshad 
 Ridheema Tiwari as Rasika
 Darpan Srivastava as Manohar
 Ritu Vashisht as Noor Aapa
 Reema Vohra

Music
The theme song, "Mera Mahi Tu", sung by Saurabh Kalsi, is based on a combination of Punjabi folk tunes and sea shanties.

References

External links
 Official Website on hotstar

2013 Indian television series debuts
Life OK original programming